Roger Federer, the seven time winner and defending champion, did not participate due to injury. It would be the first time since 2005 that he would not play in the final in his hometown of Basel. Federer had played in ten consecutive finals from 2006–2015.

Marin Čilić won the title, defeating Kei Nishikori in the final, 6–1, 7–6(7–5).

Seeds

Draw

Finals

Top half

Bottom half

Qualifying

Seeds

Qualifiers

Qualifying draw

First qualifier

Second qualifier

Third qualifier

Fourth qualifier

References
 Main Draw
 Qualifying Draw

Singles